Pentamethylmolybdenum is an organomolybdenum compound containing five methyl groups bound to a central molybdenum atom. The shape of the molecule is a square pyramid.

The molecule is similar to pentamethyltungsten in shape and properties.

Production
Pentamethylmolybdenum can be prepared from molybdenum pentachloride and dimethyl zinc at low temperature between −70 and −20. Another possible creation route, is from molybdenum oxychloride. Pentamethylmolybdenum is paramagnetic with one unpaired electron. The character of this electron is two thirds 4dz2 and one third 4dx2−y2.

Properties
Pentamethylmolybdenum is unstable and sensitive to oxygen. It turns black when exposed to air, or heated over −10°C.
The Raman spectrum has bands at 1181, 960, 90, 882, 783, 672, 620, 565, 523, 507, 451, 366, 308, 267 and 167  cm−1.

References

Organomolybdenum compounds
Methyl complexes